Juan Manuel Vazquez (born 23 March 1988) is an Argentine handball player. He was born in Buenos Aires. He defended Argentina at the 2012 London Summer Olympics.

References

External links

1988 births
Living people
Argentine male handball players
Olympic handball players of Argentina
Handball players at the 2012 Summer Olympics
Sportspeople from Buenos Aires
21st-century Argentine people